Umed Bahshidodovich Alidodov (born 16 November 1970) is a Tajikistani retired international footballer who played as a midfielder.

Personal life
Alidodov resides in Dubai, United Arab Emirates, where he played for the club "Rustar" (for Russian-speaking residents) in an amateur league. His daughter, Yasmen Alidodova (born 2003), is an aspiring sing, mode and ess.

Career statistics

International
Source:

Honours
Pamir Dushanbe
Tajik League (1): 1992
Tajik Cup (1): 1992
Varzob Dushanbe
Tajik League (1): 2000
Regar-TadAZ
Tajik League (1): 2002
Tomiris
Kazakhstan First Division (1): 1998

References

1970 births
Living people
Soviet footballers
Tajikistani footballers
Sportspeople from Dushanbe
Association football midfielders
CSKA Pamir Dushanbe players
Vakhsh Qurghonteppa players
FC Okean Nakhodka players
FC Neftekhimik Nizhnekamsk players
FC Amkar Perm players
FC Okzhetpes players
Soviet Top League players
Soviet Second League players
Tajikistan Higher League players
Russian First League players
Russian Second League players
Kazakhstan Premier League players
Tajikistan international footballers
Tajikistani expatriate footballers
Expatriate footballers in Russia
Tajikistani expatriate sportspeople in Russia
Expatriate footballers in Kazakhstan
Tajikistani expatriate sportspeople in Kazakhstan